Alessandro Marotta (born 15 July 1986) is an Italian professional footballer who plays as a forward for  club Viterbese.

Club career

Ternana
Born in Naples, Campania, Marotta started his career at a local club of Vomero, Naples. In August 2002, he was loaned to Umbria side Ternana and turned to a permanent deal in the next season. After spent a season with Serie D side Spoleto, in summer 2005, he was loaned to Serie C2 team Olbia from the Serie B side, but the loan was pre-matured in January 2006. With the Serie B struggler, he played nil matches and Ternana relegated at the end of season.

On 30 August 2006, he was loaned to fellow Serie C1 side Martina along with Raffaele Perna, which the club also signed Nicola Mancino in co-ownership deal. In January 2007, he was loaned to Serie C2 side Igea Virtus along with Jonatan Alessandro.

In 2007–08 season, he left for Serie C2 side Scafatese in co-ownership deal, along with Perna who went on loan, but still failed to score any goal.

Serie D
Marotta left for Serie D side Arrone in summer 2008, and found the way to score, made him earned a contract with newly promoted Serie A side Bari in June 2009.

Bari
Marotta became a player a Bari in June 2009. However, he never settled in Bari but loaned out several times.

Gubbio
He was farmed to Lega Pro Seconda Divisione (ex-Serie C2) side Gubbio in a co-ownership deal on 2 July 2009, for a peppercorn of €500. Bari youth products Giacinto Allegrini and Leonardo Pérez also joined the club on loan. With Gubbio, he scored 20 league goals in regular season (in Group B), and was the joint-topscorer of the league in regular season along with Daniel Ciofani (of Group C). Both players scored in promotion playoffs, which Marotta scored once and Ciofani scored twice, both winning the final, made Marotta was the second highest topscorer of the league (overall).

Return to Bari
On 25 June 2010, Bari bought him back in a 2-year contract for €60,000. On 3 July, he was loaned to Lega Pro Prima Divisione side Lucchese. He scored 13 league goals as team-topscorer.
On 1 July 2011 he signed a new 4-year contract with Bari.

On 12 January 2012 he was signed by Spezia Calcio of Serie B for €200,000.

Marotta left for Cremonese on 31 July 2012. On 15 January 2013 he left for Benevento. Marotta was a player for Bari in the first half of 2013–14 Serie B. On 10 January 2014 he left for U.S. Grosseto F.C.

Benevento
On 12 July 2014 Marotta was signed by Benevento in a 2-year contract.

Siena
On 10 August 2016 Marotta was signed by Robur Siena in a 3-year deal. He wore number 10 for the club.

Vicenza
On 15 July 2019, Marotta joined Vicenza on a 2-year contract.

Juve Stabia
On 1 February 2021 he moved to Serie C club Juve Stabia.

Modena
On 4 July 2021 he signed a two-year contract with Modena. He missed most of the 2021–22 season after a toe surgery.

Viterbese
On 30 August 2022, Marotta moved to Viterbese in Serie C.

International career
Marotta played his only game for the Italy youth national team at under-18 level on 10 December 2003, against the Slovenia national under-18 football team.

References

External links
 FIGC National Team data  
 Profile at Football.it  
 

1986 births
Living people
Footballers from Naples
Italian footballers
Association football forwards
Serie B players
Serie C players
Serie D players
Ternana Calcio players
Olbia Calcio 1905 players
A.S.D. Martina Calcio 1947 players
S.S. Scafatese Calcio 1922 players
A.S. Gubbio 1910 players
S.S.C. Bari players
S.S.D. Lucchese 1905 players
Spezia Calcio players
U.S. Cremonese players
Benevento Calcio players
F.C. Grosseto S.S.D. players
A.C.N. Siena 1904 players
Catania S.S.D. players
L.R. Vicenza players
S.S. Juve Stabia players
Modena F.C. players
U.S. Viterbese 1908 players
Italy youth international footballers